Saks OFF 5TH, formerly Saks Fifth Avenue Off 5th, is an American off-price department store chain founded in 1990, and a sister brand to the luxury department store chain Saks Fifth Avenue. Both chains were owned by holding company Saks, Inc. until its acquisition by the Canadian-founded Hudson's Bay Company in 2013. Saks Off 5th grew throughout the United States before expanding into Canada in 2016. It competes with off-price department stores including Burlington, Macy's Backstage, Nordstrom Rack, Ross Dress for Less, and the TJX Companies.

, Saks Off 5th operates 102 off-price department stores across United States.

History 
Saks Fifth Avenue opened the first Off 5th location in 1990 and originally opened a clearance store. Until 2013, Saks Fifth Avenue owned the chain until both Saks Off 5th and Saks Fifth Avenue were purchased by Hudson's Bay Company (HBC), along with HBC's namesake Canadian department stores. In February 2020, HBC announced that former Nordstrom Rack executive Paige Thomas was the new president of Saks Off 5th.

Brand identity

Gallery

References

External links 
 

American companies established in 1990
Clothing retailers of the United States
Department stores of Canada
Department stores of the United States
Discount stores of Canada
Discount stores of the United States
Hudson's Bay Company
Online clothing retailers of Canada
Online clothing retailers of the United States
Retail companies established in 1990
Saks Fifth Avenue